Arduaine (pronounced "Ard oo an-ye") is a village in Argyll and Bute, Scotland.

Arduaine is a tiny hamlet just south of Kilmelford. On the reef just outlying, it has very good, classic Scottish diving, with scallops, lobster and many local Melfort prawns and "Squat" lobsters.

From a small pier, the holiday cottages on the Island of Shuna are kept supplied during the holiday season.

Arduaine is home to the Arduaine Gardens which are in the care of the National Trust for Scotland and listed on the Inventory of Gardens and Designed Landscapes in Scotland.

References

External links

Arduaine, Kilmelford and Kilninver Home Page
National Trust for Scotland: Arduaine Garden

Pronunciation is Ardoonie

Villages in Argyll and Bute